The Men's 50 km walk event at the 1998 European Championships in Budapest, Hungary was held on Friday August 21, 1998.

Medalists

Abbreviations
All times shown are in hours:minutes:seconds

Records

Final ranking

See also
 1998 Race Walking Year Ranking

References
 Results
 todor66
 athletix

Walk 50 km
Racewalking at the European Athletics Championships